Chase the Sun is the debut studio album by American country music artist Shannon Lawson. It was released in 2002 (see 2002 in country music) on the MCA Nashville label, and it produced two singles: "Dream Your Way to Me" and "Goodbye on a Bad Day", which respectively reached #45 and #28 on the Billboard country charts, while the album peaked at #35 on the Top Country Albums charts.

History
When Lason was signed to MCA Nashville in 2002, he caught the attention of record producer Mark Wright, who was impressed with the range of material that Lawson had shown on his demo tape. Wright, then, decided to give Lawson "the freedom to experiment" in the studio, and the resulting album featured experimental instrumentation, such as on "This Old Heart", where Chris Thile of Nickel Creek played mandolin. Thile's mandolin was recorded through an amplifier, giving what Wright described as a "real crunchy sound, very different". Other songs on the album were described as "instrumentally driven". Also included was a cover of Marvin Gaye's "Let's Get It On", done here in a bluegrass style.

After the release of this album, Lawson was dropped from MCA Nashville. In 2004, he signed to Equity Music Group, a label owned by Clint Black. Although Lawson charted two singles on Equity, his second album was never released.

Track listing

Personnel
Ron Block – banjo
Bekka Bramlett – background vocals
J. T. Corenflos – electric guitar
Eric Darken – percussion
Jerry Douglas – Dobro
Dan Dugmore – acoustic guitar, pedal steel guitar
Stuart Duncan – fiddle
Kim Fleming – background vocals
Pat Flynn – acoustic guitar, 12-string guitar, bouzouki
Shannon Forrest – drums
Andrew Gold – electric guitar, background vocals
Kenny Greenberg – acoustic guitar, electric guitar
Vicki Hampton – background vocals
Jim Horn – horns
John Jorgenson – electric guitar
Shannon Lawson – lead vocals, acoustic guitar, electric guitar
Sam Levine – horns
Gene Miller – background vocals
Steve Nathan – piano, keyboards, Hammond organ
Michael Rhodes – bass guitar
Dennis Solee – horns
Harry Stinson – background vocals
Russell Terrell – background vocals
Chris Thile – mandolin

Strings performed by the Nashville String Machine, conducted and arranged by David Campbell.

Chart performance

References

2002 debut albums
Shannon Lawson albums
MCA Records albums
Albums produced by Mark Wright (record producer)
Albums produced by Greg Droman